Supriya Pilgaonkar (née Sabnis) is an Indian actress who has worked in several Marathi and Hindi films and television series. She is married to actor Sachin Pilgaonkar and made her debut as Chameli in his superhit film Navri Mile Navryala. She is the winner of Nach Baliye 1.

Personal life 

Pilgaonkar was born as Supriya Sabnis in a Maharashtrian family in Mumbai, India. She met her husband, Sachin Pilgaonkar while shooting for a Marathi movie Navri Mile Navryala, which he was directing. They got married in 1985, when she was 18 and have a daughter, Shriya Pilgaonkar.

Career 
Pilgaonkar has acted in a handful of television serials; the most popular of them are Tu Tu Main Main, Kuch Rang Pyar Ke Aise Bhi, Sasural Genda Phool, Radhaa Ki Betiyaan Kuch Kar Dikhayengi and Kadvee Khattee Meethi. Tu Tu Main Main was a comic look at the differences and affection between a mother-in-law and daughter-in-law, in which she played the daughter-in-law. In its sequel, Kadvee Khattee Meethi, she got a new role to play — as a mother-in-law. In 2011, she participated in the comedy show, Comedy Ka Maha Muqabala.

She has a known contribution in Marathi films as well. The movies in which she has acted with her husband Sachin Pilgaonkar, like Navri Mile Navryala, Majha Pati Karodpati, Ashi Hi Banwa Banvi, Aaytya Gharat Gharoba, were major successes.

Pilgaonkar has also acted in a handful of movies such as Awara Paagal Deewana, Aetbaar, Deewane Huye Paagal and Barsaat.

Pilgaonkar and Sachin appeared together on the dance show, Nach Baliye and emerged as the winners of season 1.

Filmography

Television

Fiction

Non-fiction

Films and plays

Web series

Awards and nominations

See also

List of Indian television actresses
List of Hindi television actresses
List of Indian film actresses

References

External links

Living people
20th-century Indian actresses
21st-century Indian actresses
Indian women comedians
Actresses in Marathi cinema
Actresses in Hindi cinema
Indian film actresses
Indian television actresses
Indian soap opera actresses
Indian women television presenters
Indian television presenters
Nach Baliye winners
Actresses from Mumbai
Marathi people
Year of birth missing (living people)